E! is a European pay television channel, operated by E! Entertainment Europe B.V. and owned by NBCUniversal & Sky Group. It features entertainment-related programming, reality television and Hollywood gossip and news. E! currently has an audience reach of 600 million homes internationally.

History

E! in Europe before 2004

E! Entertainment Television was founded by Larry Namer and Alan Mruvka in the United States.

The network launched on 31 July 1987 as Movietime, a service that aired movie trailers, entertainment news, event and awards coverage, and interviews as an early example of a national barker channel. Three years later, in June 1990, Movietime was renamed E! Entertainment Television to emphasise its widening coverage of the celebrity–industrial complex, contemporary film, television and music, daily Hollywood gossip, and fashion.

In the Fall of 1999, Zone Vision launched E! Entertainment in Poland, under a licensing agreement on the Polish digital platform Wizja TV, with Zone's Studio Company providing localized content. The channel was shut down by 2002.

E! enters Europe
In 2002 E! launched in Europe with its headquarters situated in Amsterdam in the Netherlands. One of the first countries E! broadcast in was Germany, where it telecast daily. In the Summer of 2006 E! began localizing in France, Italy and the UK.

At the end of 2011 E! launched in HD in Eastern Europe. Followed by The UK and Ireland on 8 October 2012, Germany on 30 April 2013 and other European countries.

Universal Channel and E!’s Closure in Russia
In April 30, 2015, E! was closed during technical problems, along with Universal Channel.

E! has localised versions of the same channel, including:
 E! (Africa)
 E! (Balkans)
 E! (Benelux)
 E! (France)
 E! (Germany, closed)
 E! (Greece and Cyprus)
 E! (Israel)
 E! (Italy, closed)
 E! (Poland)
 E! (Romania)
 E! (Russia, closed)
 E! (Serbia)
 E! (Slovenia)
 E! (UK and Ireland)

Programming

See also
E! – The American network.
E! (Canadian TV channel) – The Canadian version.
E! (Australia) - the Australian version.

References

External links

E! Online International Official Site

Television channels and stations established in 2002
Infotainment
E!
Television channels in Italy
Television channels in Greece
Television channels in the Netherlands
Television channels in Flanders
Television channels in Belgium
Television channels in the United Kingdom
Television channels in North Macedonia
Universal Networks International
NBCUniversal networks
Defunct television channels in Italy
Defunct television channels in Switzerland
Defunct television channels in Austria
Defunct television channels in Germany
Defunct television channels in Russia